is the first season of its series that is the 21st entry in the Tsuburaya Productions' long-running Ultra Series. It is an adaption of the video game Mega Monster Battle: ULTRA MONSTERS. The show first aired on December 1, 2007 and concluded on February 23, 2008. On December 20, 2008, the second season titled  premiered. Ultra Galaxy was the first Ultra Series to be shown as a pay-per-view service.

On July 25, 2017, Toku announced that the series (along with its second season) would air in the United States on its channel with English subtitles beginning August 31, 2017.

50 years after the extinction of monsters, humanity had finally advanced to outer space.

The crews of Space Pendragon were tasked to investigate Planet Boris after communications on that planet were mysteriously halted. Arriving on the planet, the crew was astonished to find it inhabited by monsters, with every nearby city destroyed. While forced to wait for reinforcements, the crew must solve the mystery of this planet's background as a monster tamer named Rei, whose past remained mysterious, joined ZAP SPACY in order to learn his past.

Characters

Main characters

Monsters of Planet Boris
: The first monster to appear in the series, Telesdon attacked Sadola before Red King joined the commotion and beaten the two, forcing Telesdon to retreat while Sadola died from its fight. It soon resurfaced and attacked the Pendragon before Rei summoned his Gomora and defeated it. Another Telesdon was summoned by Bullton as its fight representative alongside Red King and Neronga but was unfortunately tricked into attacking its own allies before being killed by Gomora. First appeared in episode 22 of Ultraman.
: A monster who fought Telesdon before being defeated by Red King, therefore marking its first kill. Several Sadola appeared later on in episode 5, with a total of eight killed by Kate's Fire Golza and five others in later episode were killed by ZAP Spacy. First appeared in episode 3 of Return of Ultraman.
: One of the earliest monsters to arrive on Planet Boris following Bullton, Red King firstly killed Sadola before setting its sight on the ZAP Spacy's Pendragon, only to be killed by Rei's Gomora. Another Red King was summoned by Bullton as a fight representative against ZAP Spacy alongside Telesdon and Neronga before it was killed by Gomora and Litra. First appeared in episode 8 of Ultraman.
: Only appeared as a carcass, Rei first emerged from the monster, which eventually leads him to his first encounter with ZAP Spacy. First appeared in episode 5 of Ultra Q.
: Only appeared as a carcass, Mukadender's death was caused by a Golza with ZAP Spacy initially mistaking Rei's monster as its perpetrator. First appeared in episode 26 of Ultraman Taro.
: A giant flower which encountered the ZAP Spacy, it began to attack them until Litra fired its Citronella Acid to destroy it. First appeared in episode 5 of Ultra Q, where it was also called by the name .
: A monster which previously killed Mukadender. Alongside Telesdon, it tried to attack ZAP Spacy until both were defeated by Gomora. First appeared in episode 1 of Ultraman Tiga.
: A monster with the ability to turn invisible and manipulate electricity. Having defeated a Gudon, it attacked the Space Pendragon during the night to absorb its electricity before moving on towards a facility. Although using its invisibility again, Rei's hearings allowed Gomora to turn the tides and finish it. Another Neronga was summoned sometime later by Bullton as a fight representative alongside Telesdon and Red King but was quickly defeated when Telesdon accidentally attacked the monster. First appeared in episode 3 of Ultraman.
: A monster that first fought Neronga before being killed with relative ease. First appeared in episode 5 of Return of Ultraman.
: A monster which attacked the Resort and Transport Base, this monster was thought to be the murderer of Haruna's brother, driving her to a conquest for vengeance before Rei joined in to save her. Although shown with the ability to absorb incoming attacks, the strategized formation of Litra and Gomora allowed the monster to be killed. First appeared in episode 18 of Return of Ultraman.

Episodes

Principal cast
 - 
 - 
 - 
 - 
 - 
 - 
 - 
 - 
 -

Suit actors
Gomora - 
Reimon - 

Songs
Opening theme

Lyrics, Composition, Arrangement: 
Artist: Project DMM

Ending theme

Lyrics & Composition: 
Arrangement:  & Lekkazan
Artist:

References

External links
Official Ultra Galaxy Mega Monster Battle site 
Official Mega Monster Battle: ULTRA MONSTERS site 
Ultra Galaxy Mega Monster Battle at TV Tokyo 

2007 Japanese television series debuts
2008 Japanese television series endings
Mega Monster Battle
Television series about alien visitations